Acropora horrida is a species of acroporid coral that was first described by James Dwight Dana in 1846. It is listed as a vulnerable species on the IUCN Red List, and it is thought to have a decreasing population. It is not common and found over a large area, and is listed under CITES Appendix II.

Description
Acropora horrida forms in colonies, which are mainly open branched. It is light blue, dark blue, light yellow, or brown in colour, with white or pale blue polyps. The main branches contain an unorganised structure of branchlets, based on examples in water showing turbidity. However, in clear water, the branchlets are short, making the structure appear bristly. The corallites are rough and irregularly placed, and tentacles enlarge during the day. There are no similar species within genus Acropora. It is found in marine, tropical, shallow reefs, mainly in turbid water near fringing reefs. It is believed to survive for more than ten years, and reaches maturity at between three and eight. It is composed of aragonite (calcium carbonate).

Distribution
Acropora horrida occurs over a large area but is not common; the Red Sea, the Indian Ocean, the Gulf of Aden, the Persian Gulf, the Indo-Pacific, the East China Sea, Japan, and Southeast Asia, the Line Islands, Indonesia, and Palau. Recently, numbers for the species have declined in the Great Barrier Reef, Papua New Guinea, Kimbe Bay, and Orpheus Island. There is no specific population data for this species, but numbers have been observed to be declining in some locations, and are believed to be decreasing in others. It is not very resistant to disease and bleaching by sea temperature increases, and is affected by being prey to Acanthaster planci, climate change, fishing, human activity and industry, and pollution. It is listed as a vulnerable species on the IUCN Red List, and is also listed under CITES Appendix II.

Taxonomy
It was first described by James Dwight Dana in 1846 as Madrepora horrida in Fiji.

References

Acropora
Cnidarians of the Indian Ocean
Cnidarians of the Pacific Ocean
Fauna of the Red Sea
Marine fauna of Asia
Marine fauna of Oceania
Marine fauna of Southeast Asia
Marine fauna of Western Asia
Anthozoa of Australia
Vulnerable fauna of Asia
Vulnerable fauna of Australia
Vulnerable fauna of Oceania
Corals described in 1846
Taxa named by James Dwight Dana